The Abhidhānappadīpikā is a Pali thesaurus composed in the twelfth century by the Sri Lankan grammarian Moggallāna Thera. It is based on the Sanskrit thesaurus Amarakośa, and closely follows its style and method. 

Like the Amarakośa, the Abhidhānappadīpikā consists of three parts: celestial objects, terrestrial objects and miscellaneous objects. Each part consists of several sections. The work is a thesaurus or dictionary of synonyms, grouping together the names of a particular thing in verse form for easy memorization.

Commentaries
A commentary was written by a Burmese minister under King Kittisīhasūra around the 14th century. A Burmese translation was made in the eighteenth century. A paraphrase (sanna) and a subcommentary (ṭīkā) were composed in Sri Lanka. According to Malalasekera, the sanna is the older and more valuable work.

Editions
Abhidhānappadīpikā; or, Dictionary of the Pali language by Vaskaduve Subhuti, Colombo, 1865, A Sinhala script edition with English explanations. Available on Archive.org.

A fully romanized edition of this, input by the Sri Lanka Tripitaka Project,  is available on GRETIL.

References

Thesauri
Pali literature
History of literature